Ethyl lactate, also known as lactic acid ethyl ester, is the organic compound with the formula CH3CH(OH)CO2CH2CH3. It is the ethyl ester of lactic acid.  A colorless liquid, it is a chiral ester.  Being naturally derived, it is readily available as a single enantiomer. It is commonly used as a solvent. This compound is considered biodegradable and can be used as a water-rinsible degreaser. Ethyl lactate is found naturally in small quantities in a wide variety of foods including wine, chicken, and various fruits. The odor of ethyl lactate when dilute is mild, buttery, creamy, with hints of fruit and coconut.

Production
Ethyl lactate is produced from biological sources, and can be either the levo (S) form or dextro (R) form, depending on the organism that is the source of the lactic acid. Most biologically sourced ethyl lactate is ethyl (−)-L-lactate (ethyl (S)-lactate). Ethyl lactate is also produced industrially from petrochemical stocks, and this ethyl lactate consists of the racemic mixture of levo and dextro forms.

Applications 
Because both enantiomers are found in nature, and because ethyl lactate is easily biodegradable, it is considered to be a "green solvent." Ethyl lactate and its aqueous solutions are used as sustainable media for organic synthesis. Due to its relatively low toxicity, ethyl lactate is used commonly in pharmaceutical preparations, food additives, and fragrances. Ethyl lactate is also used as solvent for nitrocellulose, cellulose acetate, and cellulose ethers.

Further reading

References

Ester solvents
Ethyl esters
Lactate esters
Sweet-smelling chemicals